The 1920 Copa Aldao was the final match to decide the winner of the Copa Aldao, the 6th. edition of the international competition organised by the Argentine and Uruguayan Associations together. The final was contested by the same teams than the previous edition, Uruguayan Nacional and Argentine Boca Juniors.

In the match, played at Estadio Sportivo Barracas in Buenos Aires on November 20, 1921, Nacional beat Boca Juniors 2–1, winning its third (and last) Copa Aldao trophy.

Qualified teams

Overview
All the goals came in the second half. It was Boca Juniors the team that opened the score with winger Pedro Calomino on 55 minutes. Nevertheless, with 15 left, Nacional scored two goals that allowed the squad to win their third Aldao Cup trophy, thanks to Ángel Romano and goalkeeper Andrés Mazali who, as a curious fact, played as forward in this match.

Match details

References

1921 in Argentine football
1921 in Uruguayan football
a
a
Football in Buenos Aires